The 1944 Gulf of Edremit–Ayvacik earthquake occurred on October 6 at 05:34:48 local time in Balıkesir Province, Turkey. The normal-faulting event had a maximum MSK-64 intensity of IX. A total of 73 lives were lost and 275 others were injured.

Tectonic setting
The region around Balıkesir Province is tectonically influenced by the large strike-slip North Anatolian Fault, and normal faults in the Aegean Sea extensional zone. A large strand of the North Anatolian Fault branches southwest and traces near the north coast of the Gulf of Edremit. This segment of the fault begins northeast of the gulf, at Lake Manyas. The segment enters the Aegean Sea near the town of Babakale, Ayvacık. Off the north coast of the gulf is a notable east northeast–west southwest trending normal fault that dips to the south.

Earthquake
The earthquake had an epicenter in the Gulf of Edremit. It was associated with a surface rupture stretching from Doyuran to Arıklı. At Doyran, eyewitnesses reported surface cracks on a road leading to the gulf.

The Gulf of Edremit represents a shallow graben in the Aegean Sea. It is 110 meters at its deepest and trends east northeast–west southwest. It is bounded by two normal faults at the north and south ends of the gulf. The earthquake was associated with a rupture on the Edremit Fault; an east northeast–west southwest trending, high-angle normal fault at the northern edge of the gulf. The total length of the surface rupture was 38 km, with the eastern half located offshore. Up to 1.2 meters of slip occurred during the rupture. The greatest surface displacement was measured near a village at 1 meter. The focal mechanism solution suggest normal faulting with a small strike-slip component.

Impact
The earthquake lasted 20–25 seconds, destroying at affecting at least 5,500 homes. More than 2,200 homes mainly constructed out of masonry were demolished. A further 3,100 homes were heavily damaged. In the villages of Hayrettinpasa and Vehbibey, 90% of all buildings collapsed. Many surface fissures appeared, and water erupted from the ground. It was strongly felt on two ships docked at a harbour in Ayvalık, a city across the bay on the southern shores. Many casualties and property loss was reported in Alibey and Ayvalık. There, 1,114 homes were demolished. Many old Greek-style houses built of stones were destroyed. Over 300 homes suffered damage and at least 92 were obliterated in Alibey.

A maximum MSK-64 intensity of IX (Destructive) was assigned to this event. The area with the worst damage was a 10-km-long elongated wedge-shaped area stretching from Tamış to the coast. A small promontory formed near Babakale. An aftershock caused the majority of damage in the village. Severe damage occurred in Kozluca and has been attributed to the local geology consisting of unconsolidated erosion sediments. A surface rupture was observed at Küçukkuyu. It was reportedly 10–30 cm wide and extended across the village. The coastal region and river valley subsided by 10 cm. Another surface rupture was documented at Adatepe, Ayvacık.

Tsunami
A tsunami was triggered and it inundated Ayvalik by 200 meters. The tsunami caused additional damage to the already heavily affected villages. A report by Gazette Tanin stated that the tsunami washd away buildings at the coast. The tsunami broke wooden boat piers and deposited marine debris onto the roads of Hayrettinpasa and Vehbibey.

See also
List of earthquakes in 1944
List of earthquakes in Turkey

References

Sources

Further reading

1944 earthquakes
Earthquakes in Turkey
1944 in Turkey
History of Balıkesir Province
1944 tsunamis
Tsunamis in Turkey
1944 floods in Europe
History of Çanakkale Province
October 1944 events
History of the Aegean Sea
History of Lesbos
1944 disasters in Turkey
1944 floods in Asia